Paul Ahlquist is a Professor of Molecular Virology and Oncology at the University of Wisconsin–Madison.

Education
Ahlquist earned his B.S. in physics from Iowa State University and his Ph.D. in biophysics from the University of Wisconsin–Madison. His research is focused  on the gene expression of RNA viruses.

Honors and awards
Ahlquist was admitted to the National Academy of Sciences in 1993 and has been a Howard Hughes Medical Institute (HHMI) investigator since 1997.

Research
His work at the University of Wisconsin-Madison focuses on molecular mechanisms of viral replication, host interactions, and oncogenesis.

Recent publications
Giménez-Barcons, M., Alves-Rodrigues, I., Jungfleisch, J., Van Wynsberghe, P. M., Ahlquist, P., and Díez, J.  The Cellular Decapping Activators LSm1, Pat1, and Dhh1 Control the Ratio of Subgenomic to Genomic Flock House Virus RNAs.  J. Virol., 87(11): 6192-6200, 2013.
Seidel, S., Bruce, J., Leblanc, M., Lee, K.-F., Fan, H., Ahlquist, P., and Young, J. A. T.  ZASC1 Knockout Mice Exhibit an Early Bone Marrow-Specific Defect in Murine Leukemia Virus Replication.  Virol. J., 10(1): 130, 2013.
Diaz, A., and Ahlquist, P.  Role of Host Reticulon Proteins in Rearranging Membranes for Positive-Strand RNA Virus Replication.  Curr. Opin. Microbiol., 15: 519-524, 2012.
Diaz, A., Gallei, A., and Ahlquist, P.  Bromovirus RNA Replication Compartment Formation Requires Concerted Action of 1a’s Self-Interacting RNA Capping and Helicase Domains.  J. Virol., 86:  821-834, 2012.
Huang, H.-S., Pyeon, D., Pearce, S. M., Lank, S. M., Griffin, L. M., Ahlquist, P., and Lambert, P. F.  Novel Antivirals Inhibit Early Steps in HPV Infection.  Antiviral Res., 93:  280-287, 2012.
Wen, Z., Pyeon, D., Wang, Y., Lambert, P., Xu, W., and Ahlquist, P.  Orphan Nuclear Receptor PNR/NR2E3 Stimulates p53 Functions by Enhancing p53 Acetylation.  Mol. Cell. Biol., 32:  26-35, 2012.
Zhang, J., Diaz, A., Mao, L., Ahlquist, P., and Wang, X.  Host Acyl Coenzyme A Binding Protein Regulates Replication Complex Assembly and Activity of a Positive-Strand RNA Virus.  J. Virol., 86: 5110-5121, 2012.
Gancarz, B. L., Hao, L., He, Q., Newton, M. A., and Ahlquist, P.  Systematic Identification of Novel, Essential Host Genes Affecting Bromovirus RNA Replication.  PLoS One, 6(8):e23988, 2011.
Scholthof, K.-B. G., Adkins, S., Czosnek, H., Palukaitis, P., Jacquot, E., Hohn, T., Hohn, B., Saunders, K., Candresse, T., Ahlquist, P., Hemenway, C., and Foster, G. D.  Top 10 Plant Viruses in Molecular Plant Pathology.  Mol. Plant Pathol., 12:  938-954, 2011.
Wang, X., Diaz, A., Hao, L., Gancarz, B., den Boon, J. A., and Ahlquist, P.  Intersection of the Multivesicular Body Pathway and Lipid Homeostasis in RNA Replication by a Positive-Strand RNA Virus.  J. Virol., 85: 5494-5503, 2011.

References

External links
His academic home page
His Howard Hughes Medical Institute bio

Living people
Members of the United States National Academy of Sciences
American virologists
Howard Hughes Medical Investigators
Year of birth missing (living people)